Russ' (Russ' Restaurant) is a West Michigan based chain of restaurants. It has 11 dinning locations including restaurants in Grand Haven, Grand Rapids, Holland, and Muskegon. It is a casual family dining chain. Their slogan is, "The Home Made Goodness People."

About 
J. Russel Bouws, began operating his first restaurant in 1934. The chain celebrated its 85th anniversary in 2019.

References

Restaurant chains in the United States